Păltinoasa River may refer to:

 Păltinoasa, a tributary of the Lotru in Vâlcea County
 Păltinoasa, a tributary of the Doftana in Prahova County